Sir Walter Gordon Duncan (10 March 1885 – 27 August 1963) was a politician in the State of South Australia.

History
Duncan was born in Watervale, South Australia, the second son of John Duncan, a wealthy and influential pastoralist and politician, and his wife Jean, née Grant. He was educated at St Peter's College, where he did not shine academically, but excelled at cricket. He was made Knight Bachelor in 1939.

Politics
He was elected to the South Australian Legislative Council for the Liberal Party by the Midland electorate in March 1918 and was re-elected in 1924, 1930, 1938, 1944, 1950 and 1956, finally retiring in 1962. He was elected President of the South Australian Legislative Council in 1944 and held the position until 1962.

Other interests
He was a longtime member of the Royal Agricultural and Horticultural Society, and its president in 1924 and 1925.

Family
He married Bessie Graham Fotheringham on 20 October 1922; they lived at 56 Park Terrace (now Greenhill Road), Parkside.

His brother, Jack Duncan-Hughes, was a member of both the Australian House of Representatives and Australian Senate.

References 

Members of the South Australian Legislative Council
Presidents of the South Australian Legislative Council
1885 births
1963 deaths
Liberal and Country League politicians
20th-century Australian politicians